Mavlet Alavdinovich Batirov (born December 12, 1983) is a Russian freestyle wrestler, world and 2-time Olympic champion, who competed in the men's freestyle 55 kg category at the 2004 Summer Olympics and won the gold medal.

In April 2006, in Moscow, he became the 60 kg European champion.

In September 2007 in Baku, he won the World Championship at 60 kg.

In August 2008, in Beijing, Batirov won his second Olympic gold medal competing at the 60 kg weightclass.

Mavlet Batirov's younger brother Adam Batirov is also a freestyle wrestler (European Champion) who is currently representing Bahrain.

See also
 List of Russian sportspeople

References

External links 
 
 
 
 

Russian male sport wrestlers
Olympic wrestlers of Russia
Wrestlers at the 2004 Summer Olympics
Wrestlers at the 2008 Summer Olympics
Olympic gold medalists for Russia
1983 births
Living people
People from Khasavyurt
Olympic medalists in wrestling
Medalists at the 2008 Summer Olympics
World Wrestling Championships medalists
Medalists at the 2004 Summer Olympics
European Wrestling Championships medalists
Sportspeople from Dagestan
21st-century Russian people
World Wrestling Champions